Ewartia catipes is a species of Ewartia. The plant's natural habitat is on eastern facing slopes in Tasmania. It is a rusty brown color and grows to around 10 centimeters long.

References

External links
Ewart

Gnaphalieae
Flora of Tasmania